The Al-Hifah dam is a dam in Saudi Arabia opened in 1981 and located in Asir region.

See also 

 List of dams in Saudi Arabia

References 

 

Dams in Saudi Arabia